235 (two hundred [and] thirty-five) is the integer following 234 and preceding 236.

Additionally, 235 is:

a semiprime.
a heptagonal number.
a centered triangular number.
therefore a figurate number in two ways.
palindromic in bases 4 (32234), 7 (4547), 8 (3538), 13 (15113), and 46 (5546).
a Harshad number in bases 6, 47, 48, 95, 116, 189 and 231.
a Smarandache–Wellin number

Also:
There are 235 different trees with 11 unlabeled nodes.
If an equilateral triangle is subdivided into smaller equilateral triangles whose side length is 1/9 as small, the resulting "matchstick arrangement" will have exactly 235 different equilateral triangles of varying sizes in it.

References

Integers